Hugh Courtenay Fownes Luttrell (10 February 1857 – 14 January 1918) was a British Liberal Party politician.

He was elected at the 1892 general election as Member of Parliament (MP) for the Tavistock division of Devon, regaining a seat where the Liberal MP Viscount Ebrington had joined the Liberal Unionists after his election in 1885. Luttrell's majority was a slender 2.5% of the votes, and although he increased it slightly in 1895, he did not contest the seat in 1900, when the Liberal Unionist John Ward Spear won it with a majority of only 15 votes. Luttrell stood again at the 1906 general election and regained the seat by a wide margin, but his majority was cut in January 1910 and at the December 1910 general election Spear unseated him for a second time.

References

External links 
 

1857 births
1918 deaths
Liberal Party (UK) MPs for English constituencies
UK MPs 1892–1895
UK MPs 1895–1900
UK MPs 1906–1910
Hugh
Members of the Parliament of the United Kingdom for Tavistock